Beatty v. Guggenheim Exploration Co. (1919) 225 NY 380 is a New York state law case, concerning the test for the imposition of a constructive trust. It is best known for a quote from the leading opinion by Justice Cardozo.

Facts

Judgment

Cardozo J gave the following judgment.

Hiscock Ch J, Chase J, Collin J and Crane J concurred.

Cuddeback J and Hogan J dissented, favouring a new trial.

See also
US trusts law
English trusts law
Meinhard v. Salmon, 164 N.E. 545 (N.Y. 1928)

Notes

References

1919 in United States case law
New York (state) state case law
United States trusts case law
1919 in New York (state)